Alexandr Zaichikov (born August 17, 1992 in Minsk) is a Belarusian-born Kazakh weightlifter. He competed at the 2012 Summer Olympics in the –105 kg event, and in the same event at the 2016 Summer Olympics. He won a Bronze medal at the 2016 Summer Olympics.

Zaichikov was suspended for 2 years in 2013 by the International Weightlifting Federation after testing positive for Stanozolol.

Major results

References

External links
 

Sportspeople from Minsk
Kazakhstani male weightlifters
Olympic weightlifters of Kazakhstan
Weightlifters at the 2012 Summer Olympics
Weightlifters at the 2016 Summer Olympics
1992 births
World Weightlifting Championships medalists
Living people
Kazakhstani people of Russian descent
Belarusian expatriate sportspeople in Kazakhstan
Doping cases in weightlifting
Kazakhstani sportspeople in doping cases
Medalists at the 2016 Summer Olympics
Olympic bronze medalists for Kazakhstan
Olympic medalists in weightlifting